The 1998–99 Liga Indonesia Premier Division was the fifth season of the Liga Indonesia Premier Division, the top division of Indonesian football. The season began on 1 November 1998 and ended on 9 April 1999. The league was made up of 28 clubs. PSIS won the title after beating the defending champions, Persebaya 1–0 in the final.

Teams

Team changes 
The number of teams dropped from 31 to 28 this season.

Withdrew from Premier Division 

 Mitra Surabaya
 PSB

Disbanded

 Arseto

Name changes 

 Pelita Jakarta changed their name to Pelita Bakrie.

Stadiums and locations

First stage

West Division

Group 1

Group 2

Relegation play-offs

4–4 on aggregate. Persiraja won on away goals and retained their spot in the Premier Division, Persita were relegated.

Central Division

Group 3

Group 4

Relegation play-offs

Gelora Dewata won 7–5 on aggregate and retained their spot in the Premier Division, Persikabo were relegated.

East Division

Group 5

Second stage

Group A

Group B

Knockout stage

Semifinals

Final

Awards

Top scorer
The following is a list of the top scorers from the 1998-99 season.

Best player
 Ali Sunan (PSIS)

Fair play team
Semen Padang

References

External links
Indonesia – List of final tables (RSSSF)

Indonesian Premier Division seasons
1998–99 in Indonesian football
Indonesia
Top level Indonesian football league seasons